Ibn Uthal or Ibn Athal was an Arab Christian who was the personal physician of the caliph Mu'awiya I and was regarded as the most distinguished of the medical practitioners of the early Umayyad period. His medical knowledge can be considered a continuation of the tradition that existed in pre-Islamic Arabia. He was  skilled in toxicology and was reportedly killed in a revenge attack.

References

Physicians from the Umayyad Caliphate
Christians from the Umayyad Caliphate
Court physicians
People from Damascus
Medieval Syrian physicians
7th-century physicians
7th-century Arabs
Arab Christians